Syria Direct or Syria:direct, founded in 2013, was an independent news organization based in Amman, Jordan, that provides news coverage on Syria's war and politics, and trains journalists. They have been funded by an American organization, the Global Peace and Development (GPD) Charitable Trust, as well as by the US State Department and several embassies in Amman.

Online news
Syria Direct is published in English and Arabic. The articles are for readers who are already knowledgeable about Syria but want more detailed information.  Syria Direct employs a small team of Syrian and international reporters who talk to Syrian activists and civilians on both sides of the conflict every day by Skype. Syrian journalists write the stories in Arabic.  The stories are translated to English, fact-checked and edited, then translated back to Arabic. Their website receives about 50,000 page views every month.  Their Facebook page has 77,000 followers. Thousands of people follow their Twitter account.

Journalism training
Syria Direct also has a training program for journalists from Syria. In the past, the training program has received funding from the US Embassy Amman's Public Affairs Section, the Syria-Iraq office of the Konrad Adenauer Stiftung organization, and the Canadian Embassy in Amman. Every six months they train twelve new Syrian journalists.  The trainees' stories have been published in USA Today, CNN.com, Radio Free Europe, and international new organizations like Le Monde and The Toronto Globe and Mail.
Syria Direct had, as of September 2016, trained 70 journalists, some of whom have since started their own news organizations. By April 2018, this number had risen to 150 journalists from 10 cohorts, made possible by a grant from the US State Department.

References

External links
 Syria Direct website
 

Organizations established in 2013
Jordanian journalism organisations